Ballantiophora is a genus of moths in the family Geometridae.

Species
 Ballantiophora gibbiferata (Guenée, 1857)
 Ballantiophora innotata Warren, 1894

References
 Ballantiophora at Markku Savela's Lepidoptera and Some Other Life Forms
Natural History Museum Lepidoptera genus database

Abraxini